Langmuir is a peer-reviewed scientific journal that was established in 1985 and is published by the American Chemical Society. It is the leading journal focusing on the science and application of systems and materials in which the interface dominates structure and function. Research areas covered include surface and colloid chemistry. 

The total number of citations in 2021 is 129,693 and the 2021 Impact Factor is 4.331. Langmuir publishes original research articles, invited feature articles, perspectives, and editorials.

The title honors Irving Langmuir, winner of the 1932 Nobel Prize for Chemistry. The founding editor-in-chief was Arthur W. Adamson.

Abstracting and indexing 
Langmuir is indexed in Chemical Abstracts Service, Scopus, EBSCOhost, British Library, PubMed, Web of Science, and SwetsWise.

References

External links 
 

American Chemical Society academic journals
Weekly journals
Publications established in 1985
English-language journals
Surface science
1985 establishments in the United States